The women's doubles tennis event at the 2017 Summer Universiade was held from August 22 to 28 at the Taipei Tennis Center in Taipei, Taiwan.

Chan Hao-ching and Chan Yung-jan won the gold medal, defeating Varatchaya Wongteanchai and Varunya Wongteanchai in the final, 6–1, 7–5.

Erina Hayashi and Robu Kajitani, and Emily Arbuthnott and Olivia Nicholls won the bronze medals.

Seeds
The top three seeds receive a bye into the second round.

Draw

Finals

Top half

Bottom half

References
Main Draw

Women's doubles